Peurawot (also known as Porawet, Sikin Peurawot, Sikin Rawot) is a traditional whittling knife of the Acehnese people from Aceh, Indonesia.

Description 
The Peurawot has a single edge blade with a slight curvature. The width of the blade is about the same from the base to the tip of the blade. The blade does not have a central ridge and back of the blade is somewhat concave. The cutting edge of the blade is a little concave in shape. This knife is sometimes adorned with a golden or suasa sampa (decoration of the hilt near the blade) and tampo (knob of the hilt).

See also

Rencong

References 

Weapons of Indonesia
Blade weapons